The Eliot Baronetcy, of Peebles, was created in the Baronetage of Great Britain on 25 July 1778 for the physician Sir John Eliot. The title became extinct on his death in 1786.

Elliott baronets, of Peebles (1778)
Sir John Eliot, 1st Baronet (1736–1786)

References 

Extinct baronetcies in the Baronetage of Great Britain